Anthony "Buzz" Andrezeski (born November 8, 1947) is a former member of the Pennsylvania State Senate, serving from 1981 to 1996. He was defeated for re-election in 1996 by Jane Earll. He was an unsuccessful candidate for the position of Erie County Chief Executive in 2009.

Andrezeski practices law in western Pennsylvania with an office in Erie, Pennsylvania that focuses on criminal law.

References

Democratic Party Pennsylvania state senators
Living people
1947 births